Gracie Barra   is a Brazilian Jiu-Jitsu association with over 1000 schools on six continents. The organization was founded by Carlos Gracie, Jr.

History
Carlos Gracie Jr., who was born in 1956, grew up heavily influenced by his family, especially his father Carlos Gracie Sr. and his brother Rolls Gracie. Carlos was working as Rolls' assistant instructor when Rolls  died in a hang-gliding accident in 1982; Carlos was asked to assume the head instructor role.
The  first Gracie Barra school was first founded in the upper-class   Barra da Tijuca  neighborhood in Rio de Janeiro.

In a few years Carlos Gracie Jr. was able to turn Gracie Barra into one of the most dominant teams in Brazilian Jiu-Jitsu winning many consecutive world titles. Despite the outstanding results in tournaments, Carlos Gracie Jr. worked hard to create a positive learning environment where all kinds of people could learn the art of Brazilian Jiu-Jitsu. At the school, people can see world champions training with lawyers, doctors, business professionals, etc. on a mutual supportive environment dedicated to development of the individual.

Gracie Barra has graduated more than 500 black belts all over the world.

Gracie Barra Instructor Certification Program 
Gracie Barra created the instructors' certification program in 2010 which aims to increase the level of instructions given to their students. Each instructor goes through a series of modules which caters to different aspects within the organization. The aim is to standardize each instruction based on the traditional teaching methods of founder Carlos Gracie, Jr.

The certification program in Gracie Barra also provides all instructors insight into the inner workings of the organization, such as the business model and strategy.

Currently, the certification program is authored by the top executives of the organization namely Marcio Feitosa, Marco Joca, and Flavio Almeida, all of whom trained under Carlos Gracie, Jr.

Gracie Barra CompNet 
The Gracie Barra CompNet (Competition Network) is designed to promote competition within the members of Gracie Barra. The tournament is exclusive to Gracie Barra school members. The rules in the tournament coincide with the International Brazilian Jiu-Jitsu Federation rules. Weight classes follows the international standards as well.

See also
List of professional MMA training camps
 Gracie family

References

External links

Gracie Barra profile

Brazilian jiu-jitsu organizations
Mixed martial arts training facilities
 Gracie Barra
Brazilian jiu-jitsu training facilities